Ban Gu  (AD32–92) was a Chinese historian, politician, and poet best known for his part in compiling the Book of Han, the second of China's 24 dynastic histories. He also wrote a number of fu, a major literary form, part prose and part poetry, which is particularly associated with the Han era.  A number of Ban's fu were collected by Xiao Tong in the Wen Xuan.

Family background
The Ban family was one of the most distinguished families of the Eastern Han dynasty. They lived in the state of Chu during the Warring States Period but, during the reign of the First Emperor, a man named Ban Yi ( or  Bān Yī) fled north to the Loufan (t s Lóufán) near the Yanmen Pass in what is now northern Shanxi Province. By the early Han Dynasty, Ban Gu's ancestors gained prominence on the northwestern frontier as herders of several thousand cattle, oxen, and horses, which they traded in a formidable business and encouraged other families to move to the frontier.  Ban Biao later moved the family to Anling (near modern Xianyang, Shaanxi).

Ban Gu's great-aunt Consort Ban was a scholar and poet, and his father Ban Biao was a prominent historian. He took over from his father responsibility for writing a history of the former Han Dynasty, a book known in modern times as the Hanshu or Book of Han. However, his work was interrupted by political problems, as his association with the family of Empress Dowager Dou led to his imprisonment and death (either by execution or torture). A few volumes of his book in 13–20th (eight chronological charts) and 26th (astronomical biography), however, was completed by his younger sister, Ban Zhao, and became a model for many other works about later dynasties.

Ban's twin brother Ban Chao was a famous military leader and explorer of Central Asia.  His sister, Ban Zhao, was one of the most famous female scholars in Chinese history, and contributed to the Han Shu, after Ban Gu's imprisonment and subsequent death.

Life
Ban's father, Ban Biao, died in AD54 when Ban was twenty-two. After his father's death, Ban spent a period of time pondering what path he should pursue in life, eventually composing a long fu on his situation entitled "Fu on Communicating with the Hidden", which is famous as one of the earliest known fu used to discuss philosophical questions. Ban did not immediately begin an official career, but remained in the Ban family home in Anling to work on the completion of his father's historical sequel to Sima Qian's Records of the Grand Historian.

Around AD60, rumors were reported to Emperor Ming of Han that Ban was "privately revising the national history", which caused the imperial court to become concerned about the type of account Ban would write of the fall of the Western Han and the rise of the Eastern Han.  Ban was subsequently arrested and the Ban family library confiscated, though Ban's brother Ban Chao was able to intercede on his behalf and secure Ban's release.  Ban was assigned to compile the annals of Emperor Guangwu of Han, the first Eastern Han emperor, and in AD64 was assigned to the collation of books in the imperial library and promoted to the rank of gentleman.  Emperor Ming was so impressed with the quality of Ban's work that in AD66 he gave him permission to resume his work on the history of the Western Han, which he worked on for the rest of his life.

Ban continued to serve in the imperial library and at the imperial court throughout the second half of the 1st century AD.  During the reign of Emperor Zhang of Han, Ban was promoted to the position of "Marshal of the Black Warrior Gate".  Ban later served as a high-ranking literary official under Dou Xian, the brother of Emperor Zhang's empress.  Although Dou won prestige for two successful campaigns against the Xiongnu, in AD92 he was suspected by Emperor He of Han of plotting a rebellion and forced to commit suicide.  Immediately thereafter, Ban was dismissed from office and arrested by an old rival, Chong Jing, who was serving as the prefect of Luoyang.  Ban died in prison that same year at 61 years old.

Legacy
The modern historian Hsu Mei-ling states that Ban Gu's written work in geography set the trend for the establishment of geographical sections of history texts, and most likely sparked the trend of the gazetteer in ancient China.

The tendency of both Chinese and Western scholars to view China's history in a dynastic framework is thought to be a direct result of Ban Gu's decision to write the Book of Han in the manner in which he did.

Ban family 
 Ban Biao (班彪; 3–54; father)
 Ban Gu (班固; 32–92; first son)
 Ban Chao (班超; 32–102; second son)
 Ban Xiong (班雄; ?–after 107; Ban Chao's eldest son)
 Ban Shi (班始; ?–130; Ban Xiong's son)
 Ban Yong (班勇; ?–c. 128; youngest son of Ban Chao)
 Ban Zhao (班昭; c. 45 – c. 117; daughter)

See also

Han poetry
Twenty-Four Histories

References

Citations

Works cited

 Bielenstein, Hans. "Pan Ku's Accusations against Wang Mang." In Chinese Ideas about Nature and Society: Studies in Honour of Derk Bodde. Ed. Charles Le Blanc and Susan Blader. Hong Kong: Hong Kong University Press, 1987, 265–70.
 Anthony E. Clark, Ban Gu's History of Early China (Amherst: Cambria Press, 2008). 
 
Hsu, Mei-ling. "The Qin Maps: A Clue to Later Chinese Cartographic Development," Imago Mundi (Volume 45, 1993): 90–100.
 
 
 Van der Sprenkel, O. B. Pan Piao, Pan Ku, and the Han History. Centre for Oriental Studies Occasional Paper, no. 3. Canberra: Australian National University, 1964.
 Yü, Ying-shih. (1967). Trade and Expansion in Han China: A Study in the Structure of Sino-Barbarian Economic Relations. Berkeley: University of California Press.

External links
 
 

Further Readings
 Yap, Joseph P, (2019). The Western Regions, Xiongnu and Han, from the Shiji, Hanshu and Hou Hanshu. 

32 births
92 deaths
1st-century Chinese poets
1st-century Chinese historians
Han dynasty historians
Han dynasty poets
Han dynasty politicians from Shaanxi
Historians from Shaanxi
Poets from Shaanxi
Politicians from Xianyang
Writers from Xianyang